Titanes de Barranquilla (in English: Titans of Barranquilla) is a Colombian professional basketball team based in Barranquilla. The team plays in the Baloncesto Profesional Colombiano, where it has won the championship four times since the establishment of the team in 2018.

History
During the 1990s, there was a professional team in the city of Barranquilla, named the Caimanes de Barranquilla. They played in the Baloncesto Profesional Colombiano and won three Colombian national championships (in 1995, 1997 and 1998). In 2003, the team was dissolved which marked the beginning of a 15-year drought of professional basketball in Barranquilla.

In June 2018, the Titanes de Barranquilla were founded by a group of businessmen in cooperation with the city's Mayor's Office. The team had its debut in October 2018 against the Warrios de San Andrés at the Arena Deportiva Elías Chegwin in Barranquilla, led by Tomás Díaz, coach of the national team and multiple champion of the Colombian league. 

Titanes became the first Barranquilla team in 15 years to play in Colombia's first division. Barranquilla's major Alejandro Char Chaljub stressed that the team would enjoy his full support as it supports the development of the local youth. Chaljub added that the idea of having the professional team in Barranquilla came from him. He said “we studied it, analyzed it, and gave the go-ahead, because after the Central American and Caribbean Games the city was hungry for sports. And furthermore, these venues need important events to keep them running and what better way than to be with a team like Titanes at the Elías Chegwin stadium.” 

According to head coach Tomás Díaz, the goal has been to compete internationally for both the senior team and for minors.

In the 2020–21 season, Titanes played in the BCL Americas, its debut in the pan-American top competition. One year later, in 2022, Titanes won the third place medal in the 2022 Liga Sudamericana de Básquetbol, the second tier league in South America.

Honours

National competitions 
Baloncesto Profesional Colombiano
Champions (6): 2018, 2019, 2020, 2021-I, 2021-II, 2022-I

International competitions 
Liga Sudamericana de Básquetbol

 Third place (1): 2022

Performance in international competitions 
Thus far, the Titanes de Barranquilla has played in FIBA Americas administered competitions three times.

Key:

 GP: Games played
 W: Wins
 L: Losses

Notable players

  Juan Palacios
  Ernesto Oglivie
  Troy Jones
  Xavier Roberson
  Michael Sneed
  Jesús Medina

References

External links
Official website (in Spanish)
Champions League profile
Latinbasket.com profile

Basketball teams established in 2018
Basketball teams in Colombia
Sport in Barranquilla